Ghiyasuddin Jalal Shah was the Sultan of Bengal from 1561 to 1563. He was the brother and successor of Sultan Ghiyasuddin Bahadur Shah II.

Biography
Jalal was born into a Sunni Muslim family of noblemen. Emperor Islam Shah Suri had appointed his father, Muhammad Khan Sur, as the governor of Bengal. However, Muhammad later declared independence from Delhi, effectively establishing a new dynasty to an independent Bengal Sultanate. He was later succeeded by his elder son known as Ghiyasuddin Bahadur Shah II.

Reign
Following the natural death of his brother Bahadur Shah II, Jalal rose to the throne as the third sultan of the Muhammad Shahi dynasty. During his reign, Hajipur and Satgaon remained strongholds, where he had coins minted. Jalal ruled for three years, before being assassinated by Ghiyasuddin Bahadur Shah III in 1563. According to the Riyaz-us-Salatin however, Jalal Shah ruled for five years and was succeeded by his son after his death, who was killed by Ghiyasuddin Bahadur Shah III during a short rule of seven months and nine days.

See also
List of rulers of Bengal
History of Bengal
History of Bangladesh

References

1563 deaths
Sultans of Bengal
Sunni Muslims
Year of birth unknown
16th-century Indian monarchs